York University is a university in Toronto, Ontario, Canada.

York University may also refer to:

 American Universities
 York University (Nebraska), York, Nebraska
 British Universities
 University of York, York, England
 York St John University, a university in York, England formerly College of Ripon and York St John
 Transit stations named after the Canadian university
 York University station, a subway station and adjacent bus terminal serving the university
 York University GO Station, a former commuter rail station near the university